IEEE 802.1 is a working group of the IEEE 802 project of the IEEE Standards Association.

It is concerned with:
 802 LAN/MAN architecture
 internetworking among 802 LANs, MANs and wide area networks
 802 Link Security
 802 overall network management
 protocol layers above the MAC and LLC layers
LAN/MAN bridging and management. Covers management and the lower sub-layers of OSI Layer 2,

IEEE 802.1 standards

The IEEE 802 LAN/MAN Standards Committee makes current standards freely available, after a six-month delay, through their Get IEEE 802.1 program.

Other recent 802.1 standards are available through the IEEE for a fee.

References

External links
 802.1 Working group web site
 802.1 WG - Project Authorization Requests

IEEE 802
Working groups